Eric Ridder (July 1, 1918 – July 23, 1996) was an American sailor and Olympic champion. He was born in Hewlett, New York, and died in Locust Valley, New York.

He competed at the 1952 Summer Olympics in Helsinki, where he won a gold medal in the 6 metre class with the boat Llanoria.

Ridder was also the winning skipper in the 1964 America's Cup, guiding the New York Yacht Club's 12-metre yacht, the Constellation, to a 4-0 sweep over Sovereign of the Royal Thames Yacht Club.

He graduated from Harvard University in 1940.

References

External links
 
 
 

1918 births
1996 deaths
American male sailors (sport)
Olympic gold medalists for the United States in sailing
Sailors at the 1952 Summer Olympics – 6 Metre
Medalists at the 1952 Summer Olympics
1964 America's Cup sailors
Harvard University alumni
People from Hewlett, New York
People from Locust Valley, New York